"Jesus of Suburbia" is a song by American rock band Green Day. It was released as the fifth and final single from the group's seventh studio album, American Idiot, and the second song on the album. With the song running for 9 minutes and 8 seconds, it is Green Day's second longest song (with the band's longest song being fellow American Idiot song "Homecoming", which runs for 9 minutes and 18 seconds) and the group's longest song to be released as a single. The studio version of the song was considered to be unfriendly for radio, so it was cut down to 6½ minutes for the radio edit. The long version was still played on many album rock and alternative rock radio stations. At most live shows on the first leg of the group's 21st Century Breakdown World Tour, the band would pick a member from the audience to play guitar for the song. The single has sold 205,000 copies as of July 2010. Despite its commercial success, the song is the only hit single from the American Idiot album not to be included on the band's greatest hits album God's Favorite Band. The song has been described as a punk rock version of "Bohemian Rhapsody."

Background

American Idiot is a concept album that describes the story of a central character named Jesus of Suburbia, an anti-hero created by Billie Joe Armstrong. It is written from the perspective of a lower-middle-class suburban American teen, raised on a diet of "soda pop and Ritalin." Jesus hates his town and those close to him, so he leaves for The City.

"Jesus of Suburbia" was the second multi-part song the group formed. Armstrong said it took "a long time" to write the song. Dirnt said that it came about from natural rehearsing between the trio. The song was an extension of Armstrong's desire to write the "Bohemian Rhapsody" of the future.
Also, the opening bars of "Jesus of Suburbia," with their guitar-voice call and response structure, seem evocative of David Bowie's "Moonage Daydream." 

Because the song changes into different sections, Armstrong’s guitars were recorded differently. The musicians would "split the signal from the guitar and send it into an amp while simultaneously going direct with it," to achieve a sound reminiscent of "Revolution" by the Beatles or the style of David Bowie guitarist Mick Ronson. In addition, an overdrive pedal was employed to accentuate gain from the instrument, producing a "punchy" sound to each chord. For the first two sections of the song, Cool emulated Ginger Baker and Charlie Watts, two English drummers from the 1960s. For the final three, he drums in his style: "I'm tipping my hat to all these great drummers that I love, and then I kick the door down and do it … my style." In addition to Watts, Cool pulled inspiration from Keith Moon and Alex Van Halen.
The song was composed by Green Day (with Billie Joe Armstrong writing the lyrics), and was co-produced by Rob Cavallo.
	
"Jesus of Suburbia" has five movements:
	
 I. "Jesus of Suburbia"  (0:00 – 1:51)
 II. "City of the Damned"  (1:51 – 3:42)
 III. "I Don't Care"  (3:42 – 5:25) 
 IV. "Dearly Beloved"  (5:25 – 6:30)
 V. "Tales of Another Broken Home"  (6:30 – 9:08)

Music videos
Two versions of the "Jesus of Suburbia" music video exist, directed by Samuel Bayer (who also directed the music videos for the first four singles released from the American Idiot album). The official music video premiered on October 14, 2005 in the UK and on October 25, 2005 on the MTV network for viewers in the US. One version is a 12-minute edit, complete with a plot and dialogue; the other is a nine and a half-minute director's cut, inclusive solely of the music itself and devoid of additives. The twelve-minute version is censored, whereas the nine-minute version is not. The video starred Lou Taylor Pucci as Jesus. Jesus' love interest (Whatsername) was played by Kelli Garner. Jesus' mother was portrayed by Canadian actress Deborah Kara Unger. Although Armstrong was originally tipped to provide the acting role of the main character, this was altered during pre-filming.

The plot of the video essentially follows that of the song. Despite the fact it is the second track, the video reveals Jesus' and Whatsername's relationship before it is revealed in the story. The video pays homage to "1979" by Smashing Pumpkins—it also made use of the snorricam which created the videos' notable up close shots in the convenience store and party scenes.

Live performances
It has been played at most of the group's concerts since its release. At many concerts on the 21st Century Breakdown World Tour the band picked an audience member from the crowd to play guitar to the song.

The song holds the record of the longest performance on the UK television programme, Top of the Pops at 9 minutes and 10 seconds on November 6, 2005.

Critical reception
Since its release, "Jesus of Suburbia" has received universal critical acclaim. People magazine called the song "epic" and a "magnificent nine-minute rock opera." It is often recognized as one of Green Day's greatest songs. It was voted the greatest Green Day song of all time in a Rolling Stone readers poll in September 2012. Magnet considered the song underrated, saying "the five-movement, nine-plus-minute song bobs and weaves its way through standard-issue pop punk (“Jesus Of Suburbia”), a piano-laced interlude (“City Of The Damned”), the slobbering, thundering middle section (“I Don’t Care”), [and] acoustic mid-tempo connective tissue (“Dearly Beloved”)." In 2022, Variety ranked it as one of the best emo songs of all time.

Credits and personnel
Songwriting – Billie Joe Armstrong, Mike Dirnt, Tré Cool
Production – Rob Cavallo, Green Day

Track listings

10"

Charts

Certifications

References

External links
 Green Day plan ambitious video for next single
 Think Green Day's "September" Clip Is Epic? Just Wait For "Jesus Of Suburbia"

2003 songs
2004 songs
2005 singles
Green Day songs
Songs written by Billie Joe Armstrong
Music videos directed by Samuel Bayer
American Idiot
Song recordings produced by Rob Cavallo
Music medleys
Songs written by Mike Dirnt
Songs written by Tré Cool
Reprise Records singles
Warner Records singles